Ambrolauri Airport  is a small regional airport serving Ambrolauri, a town in Racha-Lechkhumi and Kvemo Svaneti, Georgia. The airport is owned and operated by United Airports of Georgia, a state-owned company. It has been open in its current form since January 2017, and can serve airplanes up to 50 passengers capacity.

General 
The region is of tourist interest and it is the cradle of one of Georgia's pre-eminent wine varieties, the Khvanchkara, named after the village of origin 10 kilometers west of Ambrolauri. Since 2017, Vanilla Sky Airlines flies several times a week between Ambrolauri and Natakhtari Airfield near Tbilisi with a 19-seater Let L-410. After a six-month hiatus in 2020 due to the corona pandemic, flights to Ambrolaoeri resumed in the summer of 2020, and by 2021 passenger traffic recovered to pre-covid numbers.

History

Then-President Mikheil Saakashvili named Ambrolauri in 2010 as one of the new regional airports to be developed to stimulate tourism. Finally, in 2015, the Georgian Aviation Authority identified four old airports suitable to revive, including Ambrolauri. This was the first of the four to be developed, and by 2022 it also turned out to be the only one. In 2016 the airport got a new  paved concrete runway and a terminal with an area of 600m² and space for approximately 50 passengers was built. The airport opened in January 2017. The terminal was designed and constructed in such a way it can easily be expanded if future demand deems that necessary. That moment hasn't arrived yet by 2022.

Airlines and destinations

Statistics

See also
List of airports in Georgia
Transport in Georgia
Georgian Civil Aviation Administration

References

External links
Queen Tamar Airport page on GCAA website 
United Airports of Georgia 

Airports in Georgia (country)